Roland Audenrieth (born 2 July 1979) is a German former ski jumper.

In the World Cup he finished once among the top 10, with a tenth place from Zakopane in January 1998. He won the overall Continental Cup in the 1998/99 season.

External links

1979 births
Living people
German male ski jumpers